3-Methyl-2-pentanol (IUPAC name: 3-methylpentan-2-ol) is an organic chemical compound. It has been identified as a component of hops. Its presence in urine can be used to test for exposure to 3-methylpentane.

References 

Hexanols